Hermann Götz (May 20, 1914 – April 21, 1987) was a German politician of the Christian Democratic Union (CDU) and former member of the German Bundestag.

Life 
Götz was a member of the CDU. In 1970 he was a member of the board of the CDU regional association of Hesse. Götz was a member of the German Bundestag from its first election in 1949 to 1976. Previously elected via the Hessian state list, he has always made it into parliament since 1957 by winning the direct mandate in the Fulda constituency.

Literature

References

1914 births
1987 deaths
Members of the Bundestag for Hesse
Members of the Bundestag 1972–1976
Members of the Bundestag 1969–1972
Members of the Bundestag 1965–1969
Members of the Bundestag 1961–1965
Members of the Bundestag 1957–1961
Members of the Bundestag 1953–1957
Members of the Bundestag 1949–1953
Members of the Bundestag for the Christian Democratic Union of Germany